Driehuis railway station is located in Driehuis, the Netherlands. The station opened on 29 September 1957 on the Haarlem–Uitgeest railway. The station has 2 platforms.

Train services
As of 9 December 2018, the following services call at Driehuis:

National rail

Bus services 
The nearest busstation to Driehuis railway station is Driehuis v.d. Vondellaan.

External links
NS website 
Dutch public transport travel planner 

Railway stations in North Holland
Railway stations opened in 1957
Velsen
1957 establishments in the Netherlands
Railway stations in the Netherlands opened in the 20th century